The Battle of Sulci was a naval battle fought in 258 BC between the Roman and Carthaginian navies on the coast near the town of Sulci, Sardinia. It was a Roman victory, obtained by consul Gaius Sulpicius Paterculus. The Carthaginian fleet was largely sunk, and the rest of the ships were abandoned on land. The Carthaginian commander Hannibal Gisco was crucified or stoned to death by his mutinying army.

The Romans were subsequently defeated by a certain Hanno in Sardinia, and the Roman attempt to capture the island failed. The loss of ships prevented the Carthaginians from mounting major operations from Sardinia against the Romans.

Citations

Bibliography

 

Sulci
Sulci 258 BC
Sulci